Arne Folke Harald Bornebusch (December 10, 1905 – October 13, 1973) was a Swedish film director and screenwriter.

Personal life
Bornebusch was born in Hjortsberga, Sweden. He married Annika Backelin, with whom he had a son, Lars Peder Gustaf Rudolf. Bornebusch died in Stockholm in 1973.

Filmography

As director

Feature films

1935: Skärgårdsflirt
1935: Stockholmsmelodi
1936: Kvartetten som sprängdes
1936: Våran pojke
1938: Eli Sjursdotter
1938: Sol över Sverige
1940: Frestelse
1940: Mannen som alla ville mörda
1945: Det var en gång...
1946: Per Albin svarar – Välkomna till oss
1948: De kämpade för sin frihet

Short films

1933: Hur behandlar du din hund
1934: Efter kl. 5
1934: Nordens Venedig
1934: Stockholmskuriosa
1935: Manéa, söderhavets son
1935: Stockholmsmelodi
1939: Olja ur jorden
1939: Vintersemester
1940s: Vi säljer Luma
1940: Loviselunds järnvägar
1941: Arbetsblocket Sverige
1941: Cyklister på Eriksgata
1942: Per Albin regerar
1942: Scouter i beredskap
1943: Ett lyckat bak
1943: Vi
1946: Erlander i närbild
1946: Nya melodier
1946: Välkomna till oss
1948: Det hände i arbetet
1948: Från lillstuga till storföretag
1949: Tambi

As screenwriter

Feature films

 1940: Frestelse
 1945: Det var en gång... 
 1946: Harald Handfaste

Short films

 1934: Efter kl. 5
 1935: Slalom
 1942: Scouter i beredskap
 1943: Ett lyckat bak
 1943: Vi
 1948: Från lillstuga till storföretag
 1948: Jubileumskatalogen berättar
 1949: Tambi

As narrator

 1930: Freund mit Wind und Wolken
 1934: Stockholmskuriosa
 1935: Manéa, söderhavets son
 1935: Mot höjderna
 1935: Slalom
 1935: Stockholmsmelodi
 1935: Vad är klockan?
 1936: Den vita våren
 1936: Hantverk med anor – tjärbränning
 1936: Vårt dagliga knäckebröd
 1937: Ett sommarkåseri om Norrköping
 1937: Från Bergslagsbygd till Dalafjäll
 1938: Våra barn och andras ungar
 1939: Die schweizer Landsgemeinde
 1939: Emalj
 1939: Näktergalen
 1939: Olja ur jorden
 1939: Vi går på långtur
 1939: Vintersemester
 1940: Fribrottning
 1940: Det är lång, lång väg ...
 1940: Loviselunds järnvägar
 1941: Arbetsblocket Sverige
 1942: Tandberg – Musina
 1943: Skogsluffare
 1943: Vi
 1943 (?): Oidentifierad Hälsans ABCD
 1944: Bland kåkar och paletter

References

External links
 
 Arne Bornebusch at the Swedish Film Database

1905 births
1973 deaths
Swedish screenwriters
Swedish film directors
People from Ronneby Municipality